The buildings at 24–30 Summer St. are a series of brick rowhouses in Lawrence, Massachusetts.  The three story Second Empire residences were built in 1877 for Joseph Bushnell and E. S. Yates as rental properties.  They consist of four units, arranged in mirror-image pairs.  Within each pair the entrances are in the center, and there is a projecting bay section on the outside, which rises to the top of the second floor, where the mansard roof begins.  There are single-window dormers projecting from the roof above the doorways, and double-window dormers above the bay.  Both the larger dormers and the entrances have segmented-arch settings.  The doorways are flanked by decorative brickwork, and there are corbelled brickwork courses above the first and second-floor windows.  The buildings have had only minor exterior alteration since their construction.

The buildings were listed on the National Register of Historic Places in 1985.

See also
National Register of Historic Places listings in Lawrence, Massachusetts
National Register of Historic Places listings in Essex County, Massachusetts

References

Buildings and structures in Lawrence, Massachusetts
Residential buildings on the National Register of Historic Places in Massachusetts
National Register of Historic Places in Lawrence, Massachusetts